Louisa Clarke stars in the hit Channel 4 television show Hunted.  Hunted is a British reality television programme whose first series ran in 2015.

Professional life 
 Clarke served for 10 years as a military intelligence officer in the British Army.  
 She is author of the book Callsign Whisky documenting her operations in Afghanistan.
 She is a deputy on Channel 4's series Hunted. Clarke started the show from season 2.
 When not filming Hunted, Clarke is an executive coach and trainer based in south west England.

References

Living people
Year of birth missing (living people)
Place of birth missing (living people)
Nationality missing
Intelligence Corps officers
British non-fiction writers
British television personalities
People from South West England